My Story is the debut studio album by Nigerian singer Iyanya. It was released by CN Media in 2009. The album's production was handled by ID Cabasa, OJB Jezreel, K-Solo and Tee-Y Mix. It features guest appearances from M.I, Faze, DJ Zeez, Bokwilla and Ugly.

Background
Iyanya started recording the album after winning the inaugural season of Project Fame West Africa. My Story is predominantly R&B but contains elements of hip hop and reggae. On 4 October 2009, Iyanya launched the "Symphony of Iyanya", a concert dedicated to celebrating the album's release. It was held at Ultima Studios in Omole, Lagos.

Singles
The Faze-assisted track "No Time" was released as the album's lead single. "Love Truly" was released as the album's second single. The music video for the song was shot in Nigeria. "Iyanya (My Story)" was released as the album's third single; the song's music video was shot in South Africa.

Track listing

Personnel

 Iyanya – primary artist
 M.I – featured artist
 Faze – featured artist
 DJ Zeez – featured artist
 Bokwilla – featured artist
 Ugly – featured artist
 Tee Y Mix – producer
 ID Cabasa – producer
 OJB Jezereel – producer
 K-Solo – producer

References

Iyanya albums
2009 debut albums
Albums produced by I.D. Cabasa
Albums produced by OJB Jezreel
Albums produced by Tee-Y Mix